5th Ward Boyz is an American southern hip hop trio, based out of Houston, Texas. Their name is derived from Houston's Fifth Ward. The group signed to Rap-A-Lot Records following the Geto Boys' popularity on the label.

The group originally consisted of Andre "007" Barnes and Eric "E-Rock" Taylor, with Richard "Lo Life" Nash joining the group following his release from prison for their second album, Gangsta Funk. They have been influenced by Dr. Dre, Funkadelic, N.W.A, Ice Cube, Eazy-E, Compton's Most Wanted.
                                                                 
The group was signed to Rap-A-Lot Records in 1993, 7 years after the label started.

Discography

Studio albums

Compilation albums
Greatest Hits (2004)

Singles
"Thanks for Blessing" (1991)
"Ghetto Curse Words" (1992)
"Same Ol'" (1994)
"Gangsta Funk" (1994)
"Situations" (1995)
"One Night Stand" (1995)
"P.W.A" (1999)

References

Musical groups from Houston
Southern hip hop groups
Gangsta rap groups
G-funk groups